Asby is a civil parish in the Eden district of Cumbria, England. Historically part of Westmorland, it includes the villages of Great Asby and Little Asby. According to the 2001 census the parish had a population of 280, and this had increased to 309 at the 2011 Census.

See also

 Listed buildings in Asby, Eden

References

External links
 Cumbria County History Trust: Asby (nb: provisional research only – see Talk page)

Civil parishes in Cumbria